Vera Dourmashkin Rubin (August 6, 1911 – February 7, 1985) was an anthropologist and the director of the Research Institute for the Study of Man. She specialised in the anthropology of the Caribbean.

Personal life and education
Rubin was born in Moscow in 1911, and migrated to the United States in 1912. She was daughter of Elias Rubin, editor of a Russian-language newspaper. Rubin studied at New York University, graduating in 1930, she studied anthropology with Ruth Benedict and Margaret Mead. Rubin collaborated with Mead and in 1952 was awarded her PhD from Columbia University.

She married philanthropist Samuel Rubin, they had two children, and divorced.

Career
Rubin was president of the Society for Applied Anthropology and director of the American Orthopsychiatric Association.

With Lambros Comitas, she directed a study of marijuana smoking in Jamaica, for the National Institute of Mental Health. They found no significant effect, apart from a slight reduction in the efficacy of oxygen delivery, possibly due to concomitant use of tobacco.

Rubin's Research Institute for the Study of Man worked with the Soviet Academy of Sciences to study ageing and longevity, focusing on the apparent longevity of some inhabitants of Kentucky and Abkhazia in the Caucasus.

Honours
In 1981, Rubin was awarded an honorary DHL by Brooklyn College. She was president-elect of the Caribbean Studies Association when she died. Shortly before her death the University of the West Indies, offered her an honorary PhD.

Bibliography

References

1911 births
1985 deaths
20th-century American scientists
20th-century American women scientists
New York University alumni
Columbia University alumni
American women anthropologists
Emigrants from the Russian Empire to the United States
Jewish anthropologists
20th-century American anthropologists